Will Dohm (8 April 1897 – 28 November 1948) was a German film actor. He is the father of the actress Gaby Dohm.

Selected filmography
 Waterloo (1929)
 Cruiser Emden (1932)
 Peter Voss, Thief of Millions (1932)
 The Tunnel (1933)
 The King's Prisoner (1935)
 Tomfoolery (1936)
 If We All Were Angels (1936)
 Maria the Maid (1936)
 Donogoo Tonka (1936)
 Fridericus (1937)
 Dangerous Game (1937)
 Don't Promise Me Anything (1937)
 A Prussian Love Story (1938)
 Dance on the Volcano (1938)
 So You Don't Know Korff Yet? (1938)
 Opera Ball (1939)
 Kora Terry (1940)
 Between Hamburg and Haiti (1940)
 The Gasman (1941)
 Her Other Self (1941)
 Mein Leben für Irland (1941)
 The Thing About Styx (1942)
 Melody of a Great City (1943)
 The Bath in the Barn (1943)
 A Man for My Wife (1943)
 The Song of the Nightingale (1944)
 The Master Detective (1944)
 Die Fledermaus (1946)

References

External links
 

1897 births
1948 deaths
Actors from Cologne
People from the Rhine Province
German male film actors
20th-century German male actors